This is a complete list of the compositions by the Italian composer Ottorino Respighi (1879–1936).

This list can be sorted by catalogue number (P), year composed, title, and genre.

See also
 List of operas by Ottorino Respighi

Sources
 
 
 
 

 
Respighi, Ottorino